José Manuel Hinojosa Pérez (born 20 May 1982) is a Mexican politician from the National Action Party. From 2009 to 2012 he served as Deputy of the LXI Legislature of the Mexican Congress representing Michoacán.

References

1982 births
Living people
Politicians from Michoacán
National Action Party (Mexico) politicians
People from Sahuayo
21st-century Mexican politicians
Deputies of the LXI Legislature of Mexico
Members of the Chamber of Deputies (Mexico) for Michoacán